Alfred Aholo Apaka, Jr. (March 19, 1919 – January 30, 1960) was a Hawaiian singer whose romantic baritone voice was closely identified with Hawaii between the late 1940s and the early 1960s.  Alfred Apaka was arguably the foremost interpreter of Hapa haole music, which melded Hawaiian music with traditional pop music arrangements and English lyrics to convey Polynesian imagery and themes.

Biography

Alfred Apaka was born in Honolulu, Hawaii to vocalist Alfred Aholo Apaka, Sr.  He was of Chinese, Portuguese, and Hawaiian ancestry. He was a great-grandson of Luther Aholo and grandnephew of Lydia Kaʻonohiponiponiokalani Aholo. Alfred was a graduate of President Theodore Roosevelt High School where he was an athlete and ROTC cadet captain. The family lived for a short time on Molokai but returned to Oahu.

A 1938 Royal Hawaiian Hotel engagement with Don McDiarmid was Apaka's first professional performance, followed by an engagement with Ray Kinney, and a tour of the mainland.  Apaka's band played up and down the Pacific coast of the United States 1946-1949.  In 1951, Apaka became established at the Moana Hotel in Waikiki.

Joe Glaser, Louis Armstrong's manager, and Jay Faggen signed on as his talent agents and Apaka was groomed to become a mainstream crooner competing with the likes of Bing Crosby. He joined Crosby's label, Decca Records, in 1950. Bob Hope  first saw Apaka performing at a luau at Don the Beachcomber's in Waikiki in 1952.  Apaka performed on many Hope and Crosby radio and television broadcasts as well as two appearances on The Ed Sullivan Show in 1957.  One month prior to his death, Apaka paid a visit to NBC in Los Angeles for a guest spot on The Dinah Shore Chevy Show on December 6, 1959.

When Henry J. Kaiser built his Hawaiian Village, he specifically created its Tapa Showroom exclusively for Alfred Apaka.   It was a running gag that Kaiser so loved Apaka as his own son that he planned to buy the island of Molokai and rename it "Apaka Island".  Kaiser established Hawaiian Village Records, supposedly to record many local talents, but initially only naming the first Christmas release of an Apaka package.

Apaka was a regular on the enormously popular syndicated radio program Hawaii Calls, produced by Webley Edwards.  The radio program was heard around the world and helped to propel Apaka's career worldwide.

The Decca Records release "The Best of Alfred Apaka" noted the following information in the album's liner notes:

"Alfred Aloha Apaka (1919–1960) was one of the influential performers in the history of Hawaii's popular music. Although he recorded for less than a decade, Apaka set the standards for modern Hawaiian music with his joyful, baritone vocals and highly entertaining performances. In his book, Hawaiian Music and Musicians, George Kanahele wrote that Apaka was "the possessor of one of the most remarkable voices to come out of Hawaii. A natural, untrained, voice, it was strong, masculine and agile.....a delicate instrument that could range from B flat to E in pianissimo." Apaka inherited his musical skills from his great aunt, Lydia Ahola, the [hānai] daughter of Queen Lilioukalani. In an interview with The Honolulu Sun Bulletin, Apaka's son, Jeff, who also became an entertainer, said, "I like to think that Dad's musical training came in a direct line from the queen." During the 1940s, Apaka performed with several orchestras including Don McDiamond's Royal Hawaiian Hotel house band and Ray Kenney's band in New York. Overheard by Bob Hope while singing at a luau in Honolulu, Apaka became a regular guest on Hope's radio and television shows. Although many predicted that he would become a successful mainstream vocalist, Apaka took a different route when he convinced multimillionaire Henry Kaiser to build a hotel, The Hawaiian Village, that included a showroom where he starred in his own extravagant revue. Apaka's energetic performances soon made the hotel an essential tourist attraction, and his popularity continued to grow. Plans for a nationally broadcast television special were finalized in February 1960. A few days later, however, Apaka suffered a fatal heart attack while playing hand ball."

Death

Alfred Apaka died suddenly of a heart attack in 1960, aged 40, while playing paddle tennis at a Honolulu YMCA. He was buried with a microphone in his hand. His final resting place is at Diamond Head Memorial Park.

Awards and recognition
 1995: Hawaiian Music Hall of Fame
 1997: Hawai'i Academy of Recording Arts Lifetime Achievement Award
 1997: Alfred Apaka statue, by artist Kim Duffett,  Hilton Hawaiian Village
 2009: Hawaii Hospitality Hall of Fame

References

Further reading

External links

 Alfred Apaka recordings at the Discography of American Historical Recordings.

Native Hawaiian musicians
American baritones
American male pop singers
Traditional pop music singers
American male television actors
American people of Native Hawaiian descent
American musicians of Chinese descent
American people of Portuguese descent
Musicians from Honolulu
1919 births
1960 deaths
20th-century American male actors
20th-century American singers
Mountain Apple Company artists
President Theodore Roosevelt High School alumni
20th-century American male singers